This article shows all participating team squads at the 2022 Men's European Water Polo Championship.

Group A

The following is Georgia's roster at the 2022 Men's European Water Polo Championship.

Head coach: Dejan Stanojević

 
 Sandro Adeishvili 
 Fabio Baraldi 
 Andria Bitadze 
 Valiko Dadvani 
 Revaz Imnaishvili 
 Khvicha Jakhaia 
 Marko Jelaca 
 Giorgi Magrakvelidze  
 Irakli Razmadze 
 Jovan Sarić 
 Nikoloz Shubladze 
 Nika Shushiashvili 
 Saba Tkeshelashvili 
 Boris Vapenski 
 Dušan Vasić

The following is Italy's roster at the 2022 Men's European Water Polo Championship.

Head coach: Sandro Campagna

 
 Jacopo Alesiani
 Lorenzo Bruni
 Giacomo Cannella
 Francesco Condemi
 Luca Damonte
 Marco Del Lungo 
 Francesco Di Fulvio 
 Edoardo Di Somma 
 Vincenzo Dolce 
 Andrea Fondelli 
 Matteo Iocchi Gratta
 Luca Marziali
 Gianmarco Nicosia 
 Nicholas Presciutti 
 Vincenzo Renzuto

The following is Montenegro's roster at the 2022 Men's European Water Polo Championship.

Head coach: Vladimir Gojković

 
 Kanstantsin Averka
 Dušan Banićević
 Bogdan Đurđić 
 Dejan Lazović 
 Dušan Matković 
 Marko Mršić
 Luka Murišić 
 Miroslav Perković 
 Marko Petković 
 Vlado Popadić 
 Vasilije Radović 
 Vladan Spaić 
 Petar Tešanović 
 Aleksa Ukropina 
 Jovan Vujović

The following is Slovakia's roster at the 2022 Men's European Water Polo Championship.

Head coach: Milan Oršula

 
 Dani Baco
 Samuel Baláž  
 Branislav Balogh 
 Matej Čaraj 
 Juraj Dily 
 Lukáš Ďurík
 Erik Haluška 
 Tomáš Hoferica 
 Boris Juhász 
 Róbert Káid 
 Andrej Kováčik 
 Maximilian Molnár 
 Lukáš Seman  
 Adam Šimkovič 
 Patrik Tisaj

Group B

The following is Croatia's roster at the 2022 Men's European Water Polo Championship.

Head coach: Ivica Tucak

 
 Andrija Bašić 
 Marko Bijač 
 Matias Biljaka 
 Luka Bukić 
 Rino Burić 
 Loren Fatović 
 Konstantin Kharkov
 Ivan Krapić
 Filip Kržić
 Franko Lazić 
 Jerko Marinić Kragić
 Toni Popadić 
 Josip Vrlić 
 Ivan Domagoj Zović
 Marko Žuvela

The following is France's roster at the 2022 Men's European Water Polo Championship.

Head coach: Florian Bruzzo

 
 Emil Bjorch  
 Alexandre Bouet
 Charles Canonne 
 David Caumette
 Ugo Crousillat 
 Andrea De Nardi 
 Clément Dubois 
 Hugo Fontani 
 Denis Guerin 
 Enzo Khasz
 Romain Marion-Vernoux
 Mehdi Marzouki 
 Rémi Saudadier 
 Pierre Vanpeperstraete  
 Thomas Vernoux

The following is Greece's roster at the 2022 Men's European Water Polo Championship.

Head coach: Thodoris Vlachos

 
 Ioannis Alafragkis 
 Stylianos Argyropoulos 
 Georgios Dervisis 
 Konstantinos Genidounias 
 Nikolaos Gkillas 
 Konstantinos Gkiouvetsis 
 Konstantinos Kakaris 
 Nikolaos Kopeliadis 
 Konstantinos Limarakis 
 Dimitrios Nikolaidis
 Alexandros Papanastasiou 
 Dimitrios Skoumpakis 
 Emmanouil Solanakis
 Panagiotis Tzortzatos  
 Angelos Vlachopoulos

The following is Malta's roster at the 2022 Men's European Water Polo Championship.

Head coach: Karl Izzo

 
 Jeremy Abela 
 Nicholas Bugelli 
 Benjamin Cachia 
 Andreas Galea 
 Liam Galea 
 James Gambin 
 Sam Gialanze 
 Nicholas-Kane Grixti  
 Ben Plumpton 
 Jake Tanti  
 Darren Zammit 
 Dino Zammit 
 Matthew Zammit 
 Nikolai Zammit

Group С

The following is Germany's roster at the 2022 Men's European Water Polo Championship.

Head coach: Petar Porobić

 
 Zoran Božić 
 Mateo Čuk 
 Philipp Dolff 
 Mark Gansen  
 Kevin Götz 
 Maurice Jüngling 
 Ferdinand Korbel  
 Phillip Kubisch
 Lukas Küppers
 Jan Rotermund 
 Moritz Schenkel 
 Niclas Schipper 
 Fynn Schütze 
 Marko Stamm
 Dennis Strelezkij

The following is Netherlands's roster at the 2022 Men's European Water Polo Championship.

Head coach: Arno Havenga

 
 Tom de Weerd 
 Bilal Gbadamassi 
 Lucas Gielen 
 Ted Huijsmans  
 Pascal Janssen 
 Flemming Kastrop 
 Jesse Koopman  
 Thomas Lucas  
 Jörn Müller 
 Jesse Nispeling 
 Kas Te Riele 
 Guus van Ijperen 
 Kjeld Veenhuis 
 Eelco Wagenaar 
 Jorn Winkelhorst

The following is Romania's roster at the 2022 Men's European Water Polo Championship.

Head coach: Bogdan Rath

 
 Victor Antipa 
 Silvian Colodrovschi 
 Raducu-Alex Dinca 
 Vlad-Gabriel Dragomirescu 
 Tudor Fulea 
 Vlad-Luca Georgescu 
 Francesco Iudean 
 Adrian Mihaluta  
 Andrei-Radu-Ionut Neamtu 
 Andrei Prioteasa  
 Bogdan Remeş 
 Marius Tic 
 Levente Vancsik 
 Albert Vatrai 
 Ionut Vranceanu

The following is Spain's roster at the 2022 Men's European Water Polo Championship.

Head coach: David Martín

 
 Unai Aguirre  
 Alberto Barroso 
 Alejandro Bustos  
 Sergi Cabanas 
 Miguel de Toro 
 Martin Famera 
 Álvaro Granados 
 Marc Larumbe 
 Eduardo Lorrio  
 Alberto Munárriz 
 Nikolas Paúl 
 Felipe Perrone 
 Bernat Sanahuja 
 Francisco Valera

Group D

The following is Hungary's roster at the 2022 Men's European Water Polo Championship.

Head coach: Zsolt Varga

 
 György Ágh
 Dániel Angyal 
 Gergely Burián  
 Gergő Fekete 
 Szilárd Jansik 
 Ákos Konarik  
 Márton Lévai 
 Krisztián Manhercz 
 Erik Molnár 
 Ádám Nagy 
 Toni Josef Német
 Viktor Vadovics
 Vendel Vigvári
 Soma Vogel 
 Gergő Zalánki

The following is Israel's roster at the 2022 Men's European Water Polo Championship.

Head coach: Tal Grodman

 
 Ori Buzaglo 
 Yahav Fire 
 Tal Fotin 
 Tamir Frid 
 Ido Goldschmidt 
 Tom Grondland  
 Ronen Gros 
 Nir Gross
 Gal Haimovich 
 Yuval Klarfeld 
 Itamar Kolodny 
 Dor Kotrr
 Yoav Rendler 
 Or Schlein 
 Maxim Smirnov

The following is Serbia's roster at the 2022 Men's European Water Polo Championship.

Head coach: Dejan Savić

 
 Stefan Branković 
 Lazar Dobožanov 
 Radomir Drašović
 Dušan Mandić 
 Vasilije Martinović
 Luka Pljevančić 
 Marko Radulović  
 Sava Ranđelović 
 Strahinja Rašović
 Viktor Rašović
 Dimitrije Rističević 
 Ognjen Stojanović
 Petar Velkić
 Nemanja Vico 
 Djordje Vučinić

The following is Slovenia's roster at the 2022 Men's European Water Polo Championship.

Head coach: Krištof Štromajer

 
 Jure Beton 
 Marko Blažić 
 leksander Cerar 
 Jan Justin 
 Jaša Kadivec
 Jaša Lah 
 Matej Nastran 
 Aleksandar Paunović 
 Benjamin Popovič 
 Martin Pus 
 Matic Rahne 
 Vukasin Stefanović 
 Martin Stele 
 Aljaž Troppan 
 Gašper Žurbi

References

Men
Men's European Water Polo Championship
European Water Polo Championship squads